Edwin Lloyd Pittman (born January 2, 1935) is an American jurist and politician who served as a justice of the Supreme Court of Mississippi from 1989 to 2001 and chief justice from 2001 to 2004. He also served as the State's Attorney General, Secretary of State, and Treasurer. Pittman reached the rank of Brigadier General in the Mississippi National Guard.

Early life and education

Pittman was born in Hattiesburg, Mississippi in 1935. He received his Bachelors of Science degree from the University of Southern Mississippi in 1957 and his J.D. from the University of Mississippi in 1960.

Political career
Pittman was first elected to the Mississippi State Senate in 1964 and was reelected in 1968 from Forest County. In 1975, he was elected as the State's Treasurer. He was sworn-in on January 14, 1976.

In 1980, he was elected as Mississippi's Secretary of State. In 1984, he was elected Attorney General.

Pittman ran for the 1987 Democratic nomination for governor, finishing fifth.

Judicial career
Pittman was first elected to the State Supreme Court in 1988 and reelected in 1996.

Notable rulings
In 2000, Justice Pittman ruled that the courts are not in the position of determining the state flag. He wrote, "In this case, the NAACP failed to offer any proof that the flying of the state flag deprived any citizen of a constitutionally protected right."

Family
Pittman is married to Virginia Lund Pittman and they are the parents of seven children.

References

1935 births
20th-century American politicians
Living people
University of Southern Mississippi alumni
University of Mississippi School of Law alumni
People from Hattiesburg, Mississippi
Justices of the Mississippi Supreme Court
Chief Justices of the Mississippi Supreme Court
Mississippi Attorneys General
Democratic Party Mississippi state senators
Secretaries of State of Mississippi
State treasurers of Mississippi